Nanceddan is a farm north of Ludgvan in west Cornwall, England.

See also

 List of farms in Cornwall

References

Farms in Cornwall